Nuno Sousa may refer to:
Nuno Sousa (footballer, born 1974), Portuguese football forward
Nuno Sousa (footballer, born 1993), Portuguese football midfielder